Pursuant to a law approved in 1903, "An Act for the Approval and Conservation of Certain Historical Data of Puerto Rico", the Puerto Rico Legislature created the Office of the Official Historian of Puerto Rico.  The historians who held the position during the early decades of the 20th century included Francisco Mariano Quiñones, Salvador Brau y Asencio, Dr. Cayetano Coll y Toste, Mariano Abril and Adolfo de Hostos.  The office remained vacant until 1993, when then Sen. Kenneth McClintock authored a measure to reestablish the office. Upon its approval, Senate President Roberto Rexach Benítez and House Speaker Zaida Hernández Torres appointed Dr. Pilar Barbosa as the first Official Historian in the office's "modern era".  The first female to hold the job, she held it until her death in 1997. At that time, Senate President Charlie Rodríguez and House Speaker Edison Misla Aldarondo appointed Dr. Luis González Vale, the current incumbent.

Under Dr. González Vale's leadership, the office has collaborated on multiple publications, including the letters of Resident Commissioner Félix Córdova Dávila, and several works regarding Puerto Rico's military history.  In 2005, in collaboration with Puerto Rico's Endowment for the Humanities and the National Endowment for the Humanities, his office published an eight-book "We, the People" Puerto Rican Series of books regarding the history of Puerto Rico during the first 30 years of US sovereignty.

Dr. González Vale was invited to testify as a non-partisan witness at hearings held by the U.S. House of Representatives Subcommittee on Insular Affairs on legislation regarding Puerto Rico's future political relationship with the United States.

References

Sources

 Office of Legislative Services - Senate of Puerto Rico - House of Representatives
 Colección "We the People" Puerto Rican series, 2005, Ediciones Puerto, POBox 9066272 San Juan PR 00906-6072,  Feria Internacional del Libro de Puerto Rico

History of Puerto Rico
Historical societies of the United States
1903 establishments in Puerto Rico